Suchá Loz is a municipality and village in Uherské Hradiště District in the Zlín Region of the Czech Republic. It has about 1,100 inhabitants.

History
The first written mention of Suchá Loz is from 1261.

Mineral water
The municipality is known for its mineral water spring, which are said to have restorative properties. The existence of the spring has been known since 1580.

Notable people
Petr Gazdík (born 1974), politician, mayor of Suchá Loz in 2002–2010

References

External links

Villages in Uherské Hradiště District
Moravian Slovakia